Bring Me the Rest of Alfredo Garcia - Singles 1995-1996 was the first compilation album by The Flaming Stars. An import to the United States, it was released as a compact disc on February 24, 2003, on the label Vinyl Japan.

Track listing 
"Bring Me the Rest of Alfredo Garcia" - Volume 15 version 1995
"Money to Burn" - EP version 1995
"Bury My Heart at Pier 13" - Previously unreleased 1996
"Like Trash" - EP version 1995
"Get Carter" - Single B side 1995
"New Shade of Black" - EP version 1995
"Ten Feet Tall" - Single 1996
"A Hell of a Woman" - EP version 1995
"The Face on the Bar Room Floor" - Single version 1995
"Bandit Country" - EP version 1995
"Downhill Without Brakes" - EP 1996. Also on debut album.
"Revenge" - EP version 1995
"Broken Heart" - EP version 1996
"Davy Jones' Locker" - EP version 1995
"3AM on the Bar Room Floor" - Previously unreleased album outtake 1996
"Kiss Tomorrow Goodbye" - EP version 1995
"Eat Your Heart Out" - EP version 1996
"Spaghetti Junction" - EP version 1996
"Burnt Out Wreck of a Man" - EP version 1996

References

The Flaming Stars albums
1997 compilation albums